is a subway station on the Tokyo Metro Yūrakuchō Line in Chūō, Tokyo, Japan, operated by Tokyo Metro. Its station number is Y-20.

Line

Station layout
The station consists of two side platforms serving two tracks. Chest-high platform edge doors were installed in April 2013.

Platforms

History
The station opened on 27 March 1980.

Surrounding area
 Tsukiji Station ( Tokyo Metro Hibiya Line) (approximately 2 minutes walk)
 Chuo Ward Office
 Tsukiji Police Station
 Tsukiji fish market
 St. Luke's International Hospital
 St. Luke's College of Nursing
 Roman Catholic Church of St. Joseph
 Tsukiji Hongan-ji
 Sumida River

References

External links

 Shintomichō Station information (Tokyo Metro) 

Stations of Tokyo Metro
Tokyo Metro Yurakucho Line
Railway stations in Tokyo
Railway stations in Japan opened in 1980